Fancy Bermudez (born 27 May 2002) is a Canadian rugby sevens player.

Bermudez was named in Canada's sevens squad and competed at the 2022 Commonwealth Games in Birmingham. Her side lost to New Zealand in the bronze medal match to finish in fourth place. She also competed for Canada at the Rugby World Cup Sevens in Cape Town. They placed sixth overall after losing to Fiji in the fifth place final.

References 

2002 births
Living people
Canada international rugby sevens players
Canada international women's rugby sevens players
21st-century Canadian women
Rugby sevens players at the 2022 Commonwealth Games